Black Jack Springs is a ghost town in southwestern Fayette County, Texas, United States.  The community was near Farm Road 609 twelve miles southwest of La Grange in southwestern Fayette County.  Named for the nearby clear springs and blackjack oak trees, Black Jack Springs was settled in the mid-1830s by Anglo pioneers.

During the early 1850s the earlier Anglo settlers were joined by German immigrants, including the Luck, Loessin, Melcher, Mueller and Oeding Families as well as noted German poet Johannes Christlieb Nathanael Romberg.  In about 1857 Romberg founded the Prairieblume, a literary society which was one of the first of its kind in Texas and included German settlers from the Black Jack Springs and La Grange areas.  The society members, most of whom were younger and from the better educated German families, wrote, read and discussed their stories, articles and poems in the manner of the Latin Settlements of Texas.

A post office was opened in Black Jack Springs in 1868, and in 1871 land was donated for separate white and black cemeteries.  By 1884 Black Jack Springs reported a population of 400, three general stores, two steam gristmill-cotton gins, a broom factory, a school known as "Luck's School", and a Lutheran church; Trinitatis or Trinity Lutheran Church, which served a predominantly German congregation, a number of whom had previously been congregants of the Wendish Lutheran Church, St. Paul's Lutheran Church in Serbin.  In 1896 the community claimed 100 inhabitants and had an additional Baptist church, saloon, and a cotton gin.

The Black Jack Springs post office was closed in 1910, and by 1949 the school had also been closed.  In 1967, the last remaining church, Trinity Lutheran, merged with the nearby Salem Lutheran Church of Freyburg, Texas and The Philadelphia Evangelical Lutheran Church of Swiss Alp, Texas to form the United Evangelical Lutheran Church of Swiss Alp.  Today, all that remains is the Black Jack Springs cemetery to mark the site of the community.

External links
 

Unincorporated communities in Fayette County, Texas
Unincorporated communities in Texas